Elections to the Labour Party's Shadow Cabinet (more formally, its "Parliamentary Committee") occurred in 1955. In addition to the 12 members elected, the Leader (Clement Attlee), Deputy Leader (Herbert Morrison), Labour Chief Whip (William Whiteley), Labour Leader in the House of Lords (William Jowitt) were automatically members.

The 12 winners of the election are listed below:

† Multiple candidates tied for position.

References

1955
1955 elections in the United Kingdom